The Men are a rock band from Brooklyn, formed in 2008.  The band consists of Mark Perro (vocals, guitar, keys), Nick Chiericozzi (vocals, guitar, saxophone), Rich Samis (drums), and Kevin Faulkner (Bass).

The band has produced eight studio albums. The Men's first two albums, Immaculada (2010) and Leave Home (2011), were noted for their abrasive, noise rock sound. The band gained recognition for their third album Open Your Heart (2012), which was released to mostly positive reviews, including a Best New Music designation from Pitchfork. Open Your Heart was also noted for being more accessible than the previous two albums, incorporating influences from country music and surf rock. The band's follow-up albums, New Moon (2013) and Tomorrow's Hits (2014), continued down the path set by Open Your Heart, with more melodic songs and fewer noise rock influences.

History

Formation and Leave Home (2008-11)
The Men was formed by Nick Chiericozzi, Chris Hansell, and Mark Perro in 2008 in Brooklyn. After recording a demo tape and a 12" EP, they self-released their first album, Immaculada, in 2010 and their first widely available album, Leave Home, on Sacred Bones Records in 2011. Leave Home received mostly positive reviews, with one critic describing the album as "[..] one of the most gut-punched and brain-addled rock records to arrive in quite some time." Later in 2011, Ben Greenberg, who engineered Leave Home, replaced bassist Chris Hansell after Hansell left the band.

Open Your Heart (2012)
The Men released their follow-up album Open Your Heart on March 6, 2012. Considered to be a more accessible album than Leave Home, the band incorporated surf rock, country music and pop structures into the album. Open Your Heart received critical acclaim, including a Best New Music designation from Pitchfork Media. One critic wrote "With Open Your Heart, The Men have taken that breath. And it’s only made their hearts beat faster."

The band performed at the 2012 South by Southwest music festival.

"Open Your Heart" was the last record to feature bass player Chris Hansell.

New Moon (2013)
The Men released their fourth full-length album, New Moon, on March 5, 2013. The album, which was recorded in Big Indian, New York, continued the down the path established by Open Your Heart, incorporating more classic and country rock influences and fewer noise rock elements. One critic described the album's sound as "akin to Dinosaur Jr. on a serious Tom Petty kick."

Compared with Open Your Heart, critical reaction was more mixed for New Moon. One of the main criticism directed at New Moon was the album's lack of focus and cohesion. For the most part, however, the album received mostly positive reviews, with one writer describing New Moon as "one of those excellent albums that’s going to divide opinion, especially among long-standing fans of the band."

The Men released Campfire Songs EP on October 15, 2013. The EP was recorded around a campfire in Upstate New York during the band's recording session for New Moon.

Tomorrow's Hits (2014) & Dream Police LP
On December 3, 2013, the band announced their fifth studio album, Tomorrow's Hits. The album was released March 4, 2014 and was recorded by Ben Greenberg at Strange Weather studio in Brooklyn. Like with their previous two albums, Tomorrow's Hits mixed together punk rock and classic rock influences. That same day, the band shared a video for the song "Pearly Gates".  On November 10, 2014 Nick Chiericozzi and Mark Perro have released an LP on Sacred Bones records entitled, Hypnotized as Dream Police.

Devil Music (2016)
On September 12, 2016, the band announced their sixth album, Devil Music.

Musical style
The Men's musical style has been described as post-hardcore, punk rock, neo-psychedelia and post-punk. Influences for the Men include the Replacements, Buzzcocks, Fugazi and the Velvet Underground. For the band's third and fourth full-length albums (Open Your Heart and New Moon), the band incorporated influences from country music, classic rock, Americana, doo-wop and surf rock. Nick Chiericozzi attributed the band's changing sound to their touring, saying "You start to listen to different stuff; it changes a lot because we were touring a lot. We were going to places like the UK and all over the world. You can’t help but not be changed by that."

Band members

Current Members
Nick Chiericozzi - vocals, guitar, saxophone (2008–present)
Mark Perro - vocals, guitar, keys (2008–present)
Rich Samis  - drums (2011–present)
Kevin Faulkner - bass, lap steel (2011–present)

Former members
Chris Hansell - vocals, bass (2008-2011)
Ben Greenberg - vocals, bass, guitar (2011–2014)

Discography

Albums
Immaculada (2010), We Are the Men Records / Deranged
Leave Home (2011), Sacred Bones
Open Your Heart (2012), Sacred Bones
New Moon (2013), Sacred Bones
Tomorrow's Hits (2014), Sacred Bones
Devil Music (2016), We Are the Men Records
Drift (2018), Sacred Bones
Mercy (2020), Sacred Bones
New York City (2023), Fuzz Club Records

EPs
We Are the Men (2009), self-released
Campfire Songs (2013), Sacred Bones

Singles
"Think" b/w "Gates of Steel" (2011)
"Jennifer" b/w "New Pop", Matador Singles Club
"Electric" b/w "Water Babies" (2013), Sacred Bones

Cassettes
"Captain Ahab" b/w "Wasted" (2010)
Split w/ Nomos (2010)

References

External links

 The Men's official website

2008 establishments in New York City
American noise rock music groups
American post-hardcore musical groups
American post-punk music groups
Indie rock musical groups from New York (state)
Musical groups established in 2008
Musical groups from Brooklyn
Punk rock groups from New York (state)
Sacred Bones Records artists